The Roman Catholic Diocese of Sintang is a diocese located in the city of Sintang in the Ecclesiastical province of Pontianak in Indonesia.

History
 March 11, 1948: Established as the Apostolic Prefecture of Sintang from the Apostolic Vicariate of Pontianak
 April 23, 1956: Promoted as Apostolic Vicariate of Sintang
 January 3, 1961: Promoted as Diocese of Sintang

Leadership
 Bishops of Sintang (Roman rite)
 Bishop Agustinus Agus (October 29, 1999 – June 3, 2014); appointed Metropolitan Archbishop of the Roman Catholic Archdiocese of Pontianak by Pope Francis
 Fr. Agustinus Agus (later Bishop) (Apostolic Administrator 1996 – October 29, 1999)
 Bishop Isak Doera (December 9, 1976 – January 1, 1996)
 Bishop Lambert van Kessel, S.M.M. (May 16, 1961 – May 25, 1973)
 Prefects Apostolic of Sintang (Roman Rite)
 Fr. Lambert van Kessel, S.M.M. (later Bishop) (Apostolic Administrator April 23, 1956 – May 16, 1961)
 Fr. Lambert van Kessel, S.M.M. (later Bishop) (June 4, 1948 – April 23, 1956)

References
 GCatholic.org
 Catholic Hierarchy

Roman Catholic dioceses in Indonesia
Christian organizations established in 1948
Roman Catholic dioceses and prelatures established in the 20th century
1948 establishments in Indonesia